Eduardo Márquez Talledo (February 22, 1902 - January 29, 1975) was a Peruvian composer.

See also
Música criolla

People from Callao
1902 births
1975 deaths
Peruvian composers
Peruvian male composers
20th-century composers
20th-century male musicians